Xu Jingcheng (1845 – 28 July 1900) was a Chinese diplomat and Qing politician supportive of the Hundred Days' Reform. He was envoy to Belgium, France, Italy, Russia, Austria, the Netherlands, and Germany for the Qing imperial court and led reforms in modernizing China's railways and public works. As a modernizer and diplomat, he protested the breaches of international law in 1900 as one of the five ministers executed during the Boxer Rebellion. In Article IIa of the Boxer Protocol of 1901, the Eight-Nation Alliance that had provided military forces (Austria-Hungary, France, Germany, Italy, Japan, Russia, the United Kingdom, and the United States) successfully pressed for the rehabilitation of Xu Jingcheng by an Imperial Edict of the Qing government:

Early life and career 
Xu Jingcheng was born in 1845 in Jiaxing, Zhejiang Province, and received his jinshi degree after the 1868 imperial examination. He began his civil service as a bureaucrat in the Hanlin Academy serving as the Bachelor of the six offices of Scrutiny, a compiler, and an Academician Expositor-in-waitinguntil 1884.

As a compiler, he was a keen analyst of foreign and current affairs and was first promoted and appointed as envoy to Japan but failed to journey abroad due to the death of his father and his responsibilities as the eldest son in filial mourning. The end of the mourning period allowed Xu to begin his diplomatic service, succeeding Li Fengbao, first as the Envoy to France, Italy, the Netherlands, Austria, and Germany (1884–1885), and then as the first Qing Envoy to Belgium while also concurrently accredited to France and Germany from 1885 to 1890. During this time, he was charged with inspecting and receiving the new Chinese turret ship Dingyuan , a turret ironclad warship and flagship of the Beiyang Fleet, manufactured by German shipbuilders AG Vulcan Stettin. He wrote an Encyclopedia of Foreign Ships and recommended the modernization of the Qing fleet. Until 1892, Xu was envoy to Russia, Austria, the Netherlands, and Germany.

In 1890, he was recalled to Beijing and was appointed the Grand Secretariat and Attendant Gentleman of the Ministry of Rites. In 1895, he was promoted as the Senior Vice Minister of Department of Public Works, one of the six top ministries of Qing China. During this time, he remained active in diplomacy, serving in various foreign delegations and as Envoy to Germany in 1897 and as the head minister of the Zongli Yamen (Office of Foreign Affairs) from 1895 to 1899. His foreign service also allowed him to serve as an intermediary with foreign railway companies and governments and he was charged with the modernization of major railways in China's industrializing northeast as the president of the Chinese Eastern Railway from January 1897 until his death. His final promotion as the Senior Vice Minister of Ministry of Personnel ( also made Xu the Minister of Education and Superintendent of the Imperial University of Peking (now Peking University), posts he served until his execution in 1900.

Execution 
A Roman Catholic, Xu was marked with suspicion in the lead up to the Boxer Rebellion. The anti-Christian, anti-foreign, and anti-imperialist movement converged on Beijing in June 1900 after months of violence in Shandong and the North China plain, forcing diplomats, foreigners, and Chinese Christians into the Legation Quarter. Xu, a liberal in the Qing court sided with five other members of the Imperial court, supported a diplomatic resolution and was opposed to an alliance with the Boxer fighters in a war against the foreign powers represented in the Legation Quarter. Along with Hsu Yung-yi, President of the Board of War (Ministry of War); Li Shan, President of the Board of Works (Ministry of Public Works); Lien Yuan, Vice-Chancellor of the Grand Council; and Yuan Chang, Vice-President of the Court of Sacrifices (Ministry of Rites), Xu issued a recommendation to Empress Cixi protesting the breaches of international law and urging the repression of the Boxers, the execution of Boxer leaders, and a diplomatic settlement with foreign armies. In his own written memorial (petition) to Cixi, Xu wrote, "the evasion of extraterritoriality rights and the killing of foreign diplomats are unprecedented in China and abroad." Cixi, outraged, sentenced Xu to death for "willfully and absurdly petitioning the Imperial Court" and "building subversive thought" and was executed on July 28, 1900. His severed head was placed on display at Caishikou Execution Grounds in Beijing.

Legacy 
Xu Jingcheng is memorialized, along with Yuan Xu (Yuan Chang) and Xu Yongyi (Hsu Yung-yi) at Hangzhou's West Lake where a memorial commemorates the three Qing court officials as loyal officials.

Roman Catholic influence 
During his diplomatic career, Xu was also the mentor of the future Premier and Minister of Foreign Affairs of China, Lou Tseng-Tsiang, and was instrumental in Lou's conversion to Roman Catholicism from Protestantism. Xu, as envoy to Russia took an early interest in Lou, a polyglot, in 1893 when he was posted to St Petersburg as an interpreter (fourth-class) to the Chinese embassy. During this time, Lou became increasingly religious under Xu Jingcheng's influence and instructions: Europe's strength is found not in her armaments, nor in her knowledge — it is found in her religion [...]. Observe the Christian faith. When you have grasped its heart and its strength, take them and give them to China. The execution of Xu during the Boxer Rebellion paved the way for Lou's service as the Qing delegate at the first and second Peace Conferences in The Hague (1899 and 1907), and as Minister to Belgium and Ambassador to Russia, roles previously held by Xu. Lou referred to Xu as his "second father" and never forgot his execution under the Qing court. When the 1911 Revolution broke out while Lou was Ambassador in St Petersburg, he took it upon himself, against the advice of his colleagues at other European capitals, to cable Beijing that there could be no hope of assistance from the Great Powers. At the death of his wife Lou retired from an active life, and in 1927 became a postulant, under the name Dom Pierre-Célestin, in the Benedictine monastery of Sint-Andries in Bruges, Belgium. He was ordained priest in 1935. In his later years, Lou Tseng-Tsiang hoped to return to China as a missionary to fulfill the instructions Xu Jingcheng had given him at the beginning of his career but his planned departure was postponed during the Chinese Civil War, and Dom Lou died in Belgium on 15 January 1949.

Publications 

See here for a complete list of Xu's publications.
Pami'er tu shuo (帕米爾圖說)
Xu Wensu gong wai ji (許文肅公外集)
Xu Wensu gong ri ji (許文肅公日記)
Xu Wensu gong shu zha (許文肅公書札)
Xu Zhuyun xian sheng chu shi han gao (許竹篔先生出使函稿)

In 2015, Zhu Jiaying (朱家英) published a book of Xu's collected works titled Xu Jingcheng ji (許景澄集).

References

Further reading

External links

 Xu Jingcheng und der Boxeraufstand.
 Bücher (chin.) von Xu Jingcheng in der Brown University Library.

1845 births
1900 deaths
Chinese Roman Catholics
Roman Catholic writers
Qing dynasty politicians from Zhejiang
Qing dynasty writers
Qing dynasty diplomats
Politicians from Jiaxing
Writers from Jiaxing
19th-century executions by China
People executed by the Qing dynasty by decapitation
Executed people from Zhejiang
Executed Qing dynasty people
Ministers of Zongli Yamen
Ambassadors of China to France
Ambassadors of China to Italy